The Ambassador of the Republic of the Philippines to Egypt (: safir alfilibiyn ladaa jumhuriat misr alearabia) is the Republic of the Philippines' foremost diplomatic representative in the Arab Republic of Egypt. As head of the Philippines' diplomatic mission there, the Ambassador is the official representative of the President and the Government of the Philippines to the President and Government of Egypt. The position has the rank and status of an Ambassador Extraordinary and Plenipotentiary.

This diplomatic post and the embassy have jurisdiction over the countries of Egypt, Sudan, Djibouti, Ethiopia, and Eritrea.

List of representatives

See also 
 Egypt–Philippines relations

Notes and References

External links
 

Egypt–Philippines relations
Egypt
Philippines